Sudan High School is a public high school located in the city of Sudan, Texas, USA and classified as a 2A school by the UIL.  It is a part of the Sudan Independent School District located in southeastern Lamb County.  In 2014, Sudan High School was designated as a U.S. Department of Education National Blue Ribbon School.  In 2015, the school was rated "Met Standard" by the Texas Education Agency.

Athletics
The Sudan Hornets compete in these sports - 

Cross Country, Football, Basketball, Powerlifting, Golf, Tennis & Track

State Titles
Boys Basketball - 
1995(1A)
Girls Basketball - 
1983(1A), 1987(1A), 1994(1A), 2009(1A/D1), 2012(1A/D1)
Football - 
1993(1A)
Boys Track - 
1994(1A)

Band
Marching Band State Champions 
1990(1A)
Marching Band Sweepstakes State Champions 
1992(1A)

References

External links
 Sudan ISD website

Public high schools in Texas
Schools in Lamb County, Texas